Asociación Deportiva Peña Nuestra Señora de la Antigua, also known as Corderex La Antigua for sponsorship reasons, was a Spanish women's football club from Mérida settled in the city's Nuestra Señora de la Antigua district.

Nuestra Señora de la Antigua was a founding member of the unified national championship in 2002 and played its three first seasons, always ending in the last position of the table. With the introduction of promotions in 2004, the club was relegated to second-tier Primera Nacional. In 2011 it was relegated to the third tier and disbanded.

Season by season

Former internationals
  Edite Fernandes

References

Women's football clubs in Spain
Football clubs in Extremadura
Association football clubs disestablished in 2011
Mérida, Spain